In the 2012–13 season, Sion competes in the Swiss Super League and the Swiss Cup. In the summer transfer window, they brought in Italian World Cup winner Gennaro Gattuso, as well as Kyle Lafferty (former of Rangers). In addition, they bought an until then unknown Brazilian footballer called Léo Itaperuna from the 5th division Club of Arapongas and another forward Mathieu Manset from Reading.
Already signed six months earlier, Oussama Darragi coming from Esperance de Tunis joined the team along with André Marques from Sporting Lisabon.

The 2012–13 season began well with Sion staying at the top till the 8th round. Fournier played with a 4-2-3-1 system.

On 4 September 2012, Manset, Joaquim Adão and Darragi were all disciplined after being found in the early hours of the morning in a Lausanne nightclub the day before Sion's game away to FC Zürich. Manset's contract with the club was canceled, Adão was demoted to the youth team for one month and Darragi was handed a large fine. This huge upset resulted in the resignation of Sebastien Fournier as coach.

Following this change, the results were not as convincing as they were at the beginning. Although Sion scored more goals in the second part of the first half, they ended fourth during the winter break, one point away from 2nd and 5 points from first. This increase in goals was due to the change to a 4-4-2 system with Itaperuna and Laffery as center forwards.

The weak spot during the first half was the absence of a winger on the left side. This was because Yoda and Wüthrich were injured at the beginning of the season and never recovered to their original strength. 
In addition to that, the defense was not as solid as the years before. That resulted in more goals received as in other seasons. The reasons for that were the transfer of the center back Adaílton to Henan Jianye and the simultaneous injuries of Aislan, Vanczák and Sauthier. Vanczák broke this cheekbone, but did play again after two weeks with a mask as there were no backups available. During that time, Basha (normally a defensive midfielder) played as a fullback at the position of Vanczák, while he moved into the center to his original position as a center back.

Squad

Out on loan

Transfers

Summer

In:

Out:

Winter

In:

Out:

Match results

Legend

Super League

Results summary

Results

League table

Swiss Cup

Squad statistics

Appearances and goals

|-
|colspan="14"|Players away from the club on loan:  

|-
|colspan="14"|Players who appeared for Sion no longer at the club:

|}

Top Scorers

Disciplinary Record

References

Official Site

FC Sion seasons
Sion